Washed Out is a 1995 Croatian film directed by Zrinko Ogresta. The film was selected as the Croatian entry for the Best Foreign Language Film at the 68th Academy Awards, but was not accepted as a nominee. The winner of the Prix Italia (1996) for the best fiction.

Cast

Katarina Bistrović-Darvaš as Jagoda
Josip Kučan as Zlatko
Filip Šovagović as Tukša
Mustafa Nadarević as Father
Božidarka Frajt as Mother
Ivo Gregurević as Ivo
Božidar Orešković
Tarik Filipović
Sreten Mokrović

See also
 List of submissions to the 68th Academy Awards for Best Foreign Language Film
 List of Croatian submissions for the Academy Award for Best Foreign Language Film

References

External links
 

1995 films
1990s Croatian-language films
Jadran Film films
Croatian drama films
Films set in Zagreb
1995 drama films